Malcolm Shotton (born 16 February 1957) is an English former professional footballer and manager. He was on the books of Leicester City as an apprentice but failed to make the break into senior football there. He played for Atherstone United and Nuneaton Borough in non-league football before signing for Oxford United in 1980. He formed a notable defensive partnership with Gary Briggs and went on to become captain of the side as they rose from Division Three to Division One. His finest moment as captain was lifting the Milk Cup at Wembley Stadium in April 1986. At the end of the following season he was transferred to Portsmouth. He later played for Huddersfield Town, Barnsley, Hull City and Ayr United and, after his playing career ended, served as assistant manager at Barnsley.

In 1998 he returned to Oxford as manager, replacing Malcolm Crosby. His appointment was popular and initially successful, as he led the team out of relegation danger to a creditable 12th-place finish in Division One. However, United were relegated to Division Two at the end of the following season, and Shotton resigned in October 1999, with the club in serious danger of a second successive relegation. 

In 2021, it was revealed on the Football Cliches podcast that three early teenagers impersonated Shotton to make fake transfer enquiries directly to club managers. This led to Roy Evans, Martin O’Neill, Barry Fry and others to speculate on transfer dealings directly to the impersonators who ran their scam from a payphone. It is unclear whether Shotton was aware of this during his Oxford United tenure.

Shotton later served as assistant manager at Bradford City Director of Football at Loughborough University and manager of Barnsley College Academy Team.

References

1957 births
Living people
Footballers from Newcastle upon Tyne
English footballers
English Football League players
Association football defenders
Atherstone Town F.C. players
Leicester City F.C. players
Nuneaton Borough F.C. players
Oxford United F.C. players
Portsmouth F.C. players
Huddersfield Town A.F.C. players
Hull City A.F.C. players
Barnsley F.C. players
Ayr United F.C. players
Oxford United F.C. managers
English football managers
People associated with Loughborough University
Bradford City A.F.C. non-playing staff